Flint & Kent was an upscale department store based in Buffalo, New York.

History 
It had its roots in a dry good store that opened in 1832 by Benjamin Fitch (1802–1883) at 288 Main Street, Buffalo.  In 1836, the store was called Fitch, Marvin & Co., then Fitch & Marvin — the second name reflecting Fitch's partner, Eurotas Marvin (1810–1887)

On February 17, 1865, the owners — (i) Ethan Howe Howard (1812–1898), (ii) Joshua Mortimer Whitcomb (1821–1897), and (iii) William Bradford Flint (1826–1887), operating as co-partnership under the name Howard, Whitcomb & Co. — dissolved their partnership and sold their interest to a newly formed co-partnership of (a) William Bradford Flint, (b) Henry Mellen Kent (1823–1894), and (c) R.P. Stone, operating as a co-partnership under the name Flint, Kent & Stone.  On October 25, 1866, Stone sold his interest to Henry Cogswell Howard (Ethan Howard's son; 1847–1913) and the firm henceforth was known as Flint, Kent & Howard.  The eventually became known as Flint & Kent.

In 1856 William Bradford Flint (1826–1887) joined the company, followed by Henry Mellen Kent (né Henry Mellen Kent; 1823–1894) in 1865, the store became known as Flint, Kent & Stone – and eventually just Flint & Kent.  In 1897, Flint & Kent moved its flagship store from 554 Main Street to a building that was designed by Edward Austin Kent, Henry Kent's son and noted Buffalo architect who died in 1912 as a passenger aboard the RMS Titanic.

Sale
In 1954, the company was sold to "Jack" Hahn (né Charles John Hahn, Jr.; 1927–2014), whose father owned Sattler's.  The company was sold in 1956, to The Sample.  Jack Hahn, a Buffalo native and 1949 alumnus of Princeton University, sold the company in 1956 to The Sample and went on to Harvard Law School, graduating in 1960.

See also
 Sattler's
 The Sample

References
Notes

Sources
Rizzo, Michael F. (2007) Nine Nine Eight: The Glory Days of Buffalo Shopping Lulu Enterprises, Inc.; Morrisville, North Carolina. .
Elvins, Sarah (2004). Sales & Celebrations: Retailing and Regional Identity in Western New York State, 1920-1940. .

External links
Flint & Kent Department Store, 1945
Flint & Kent Department Store at PreservationReady

Defunct retail companies of the United States
Companies based in Buffalo, New York
Retail companies established in 1832
American companies established in 1832
1832 establishments in New York (state)
Retail companies disestablished in 1956
1956 disestablishments in New York (state)
American companies disestablished in 1956